Henrik Forsberg (born 16 February 1967) is a Swedish former cross-country skier and biathlete who competed from 1988 to 2001. Competing in four Winter Olympics, he earned his best finishes at the 1992 Winter Olympics in Albertville in cross-country skiing with a fourth in the 4 × 10 km relay and ninth in the 10 km + 15 km combined pursuit.

Forsberg's best finish at the FIS Nordic World Ski Championships was fifth in the 50 km event at Thunder Bay, Ontario in 1995. His lone World Cup victory was in a 30 km event in Sweden in 1991.

At the 2002 Winter Olympics in Salt Lake City, Forsberg finished 14th in the 4 × 7.5 km relay and 47th in the 20 km individual events. His best finishes at the Biathlon World Championships was 12th in the 4 × 7.5 km relay at Lahti in 2000 and his best individual finish of 24th in the 20 km individual event at Pokljuka in 2001. Forsberg's best individual finish was second in a 10 km sprint event in Slovakia during the 2001–02 season.

Forsberg's wife, Magdalena, competed from 1988 to 1996 in cross-country skiing, and 1993 to 2002 in biathlon. They married in mid-1996.

Cross-country skiing results
All results are sourced from the International Ski Federation (FIS).

Olympic Games

World Championships

World Cup

Season standings

Individual podiums
1 victory 
5 podiums

Team podiums
 1 victory – (1 ) 
 14 podiums – (14 )

References

External links
 
 
 
 IBU profile
 Olympic 4 × 10 km relay results: 1936–2002 

1967 births
Living people
People from Borlänge Municipality
Cross-country skiers from Dalarna County
Biathletes at the 2002 Winter Olympics
Cross-country skiers at the 1992 Winter Olympics
Cross-country skiers at the 1994 Winter Olympics
Cross-country skiers at the 1998 Winter Olympics
Swedish male biathletes
Swedish male cross-country skiers
Olympic biathletes of Sweden
Olympic cross-country skiers of Sweden